Classic Shell is a computer program for Microsoft Windows that provides user interface elements intended to restore familiar features from past versions of Windows.  It focuses on the Start menu, File Explorer and Internet Explorer — three major components of the Windows shell although it also does some minor tweaks for the Windows Taskbar.  In particular, it can serve as a Start menu replacement for Windows 8 and Windows 10 systems.

Developed by Ivo Beltchev, it was first released in 2009, and has been downloaded over ten and a half million times since.

Development by Beltchev has ceased, and the project's source code has been released. Development has been picked up by volunteers on GitHub under the name Open-Shell.

Features and architecture 

Classic Shell is packaged as a suite of three components, all optional and independent of each other:

 Classic Start Menu — A re-implementation of the Start Menu, replicating features from several different generations of Windows
 Classic Explorer — An add-on to File/Windows Explorer, restoring and extending features present in various Windows releases
 Classic IE — An add-on for Internet Explorer 9 and later, it restores the web page title to the window title bar, and various details to the status bar

Classic Shell is programmed in C++.  Although it modifies Windows behaviors, it does not do so by modifying or tweaking Windows registry settings or replacing or patching system files — all modifications are done using Windows APIs.  It is localized into more than 30 languages,  including right-to-left support for Arabic and Hebrew.

Classic Start Menu 
Classic Start Menu is a replacement for the Windows Start Menu.  Features include:

 Customize appearance of the Start button and Start Menu, and menu and submenu items
 Show recently, or most frequently used, apps
 Show recently opened documents, with sorting, jumplists, and pinning
 Highlight newly installed programs
 Separate traditional desktop apps from Universal Windows Platform apps
 Sort menus alphabetically, by date, or custom order with drag-and-drop
 Windows Search integration
 Customize settings such as menu opening delay, tooltip timing, sub-menu column style, menu width, icon size, animation, scroll speed, font smoothing, etc.
 Skinning to more completely customize the appearance
 Scales icons and menu background to higher resolutions and/or pixel density (PPI)

Besides restoring past behavior, there are several new features.  These include showing the menu next to the taskbar when it is vertical, multi-monitor support, launching multiple programs at once, custom shutdown-related actions, Universal app launching, expanding any file folder as cascading menus, and additional keyboard shortcuts.  The search box can search the system path, can show partial matches, and can show all results inside the menu.

Classic Start Menu can also modify Windows 8's new UI features, such as hot corners only on the desktop without disabling them inside Universal apps.

Classic Explorer 
Classic Explorer is an add-on to Windows File Explorer, implemented as various shell extensions.  It does not replace .  Features include:

 A toolbar that can include built-in commands, custom commands, or dropdown menus for arbitrary folders.
 Customize the behavior and appearance of the left folder navigation pane, including whether folders expand with a single click or double click, connecting lines, subfolder indicators, horizontal scrollbar, tree item spacing, and keyboard shortcuts
 The breadcrumb bar can be replaced with a traditional address bar, and the associated dropdown modified to show the hierarchical path instead of recent folder history
 Sort headers in all views
 Overlay icon for network shares
 Status bar can show disk free space, total size of current folder
 Tooltip of selected item
 "Up" button for navigating to the parent folder
 Show the current folder in the title bar caption
 Copy progress dialog can be automatically expanded to show more details
 Replace the copy conflict dialog with one like Windows XP

History 
Classic Shell began as a tool for personal use, and saw its first public release in 2009.  Over time, the Start Menu component evolved to be a customizable launcher that also integrated a search box and other features of the Windows 7 Start Menu. The Explorer and IE components appeared later.

While earlier versions were compatible with Windows Vista and later, versions since 3.9.0 no longer support Windows Vista/Server 2008. Classic Shell was never popular or necessary on Vista in the first place because Vista, like XP, came with the ability to revert to a classic start menu.

Classic Shell is released as free and open-source under the MIT license.

Founder Ivo Beltchev announced the end of development in December 2017.

Open-Shell 
Since 2018, Classic Shell has been developed as an open source program under the name Open-Shell. Open-Shell has remained functionally similar to Classic Shell, but it has added some small features and addressed several bugs, many caused by new versions of Windows. Some of the changes in Open-Shell include:
 Options for changing Start menu position and alignment
 Support for jump lists on UWP apps
 Partial support for Windows 11
 New skins and updated logo and artwork

Like Classic Shell, Open-Shell is released under the MIT License. The latest stable version dates from 27 May 2022.

Reception
Classic Shell was a fairly popular interface enhancement in the Windows 7 life cycle but became much more widely used after the release and negative reception of Windows 8 (with its lack of a Start menu).

It has seen coverage in such publications as Lifehacker, Neowin, Ghacks, ZDNet, PC World, TechRepublic, MakeUseOf, and Betanews.

See also 

Comparison of Start menu replacements for Windows 8

References

External links 
 (deprecated)
Actively maintained fork, Open-Shell

Free software programmed in C++
Windows-only free software
Application launchers
Discontinued software
Formerly proprietary software
2009 software